Jack Thomas Davies (born 17 December 1995), known professionally as Jack Wolfe, is an English actor. He began his career in theatre. On screen, he is known for his roles in the film The Magic Flute (2022) and the second season of the Netflix series Shadow and Bone (2023).

Early life and education
Wolfe was born in Dewsbury, West Yorkshire. He has a younger sister. He attended Ackworth School. Wolfe started acting in a Saturday-morning youth theatre group in Wakefield. He went on to graduate from Mountview Academy of Theatre Arts in London in 2017. He also trained at Chetham's School of Music in Manchester.

Filmography

Stage

Personal life
Wolfe is openly gay.

References

External links 
 
 Jack Wolfe at Spotlight

1995 births
Living people
Actors from Dewsbury
Alumni of the Mountview Academy of Theatre Arts
English opera singers
English people of Welsh descent
Male actors from Yorkshire
People educated at Ackworth School
People educated at Chetham's School of Music
21st-century LGBT people
British LGBT people
British LGBT actors
21st-century British male actors